Craig D. Miller (born March 10, 1963) is a former professional tennis player from the United States.

Career
Miller, who grew up playing football, competed in the Big West Conference for the Cal State Long Beach tennis team in the mid-1980s. He was the No. 5 singles champion in 1985 and both No. 3 singles champion and No. 1 doubles champion (with Kevin Gillette) the following year.

On the Grand Prix tennis circuit, he was best as a doubles player and while partnering Patrick McEnroe made the quarter-finals at the Pro Tennis Championships in 1987. He took part in the 1988 Australian Open men's doubles, with John Letts, but the pair were eliminated in the first round, to David Macpherson and Simon Youl. The American also played in the mixed doubles event at the 1988 Wimbledon Championships. He and partner Jill Smoller were defeated in the opening round.

References

1963 births
Living people
American male tennis players
Long Beach State Beach men's tennis players
Tennis people from California